Kossi Aguessy (full name KossiGan Baaba-Thunde Aguessy) was a Togolese and Brazilian industrial designer and artist.

Biography 
Born April 17, 1977, in Lomé, Togo, Aguessy studied industrial and interior design at the Central Saint Martins College of Arts and Design in London. He lived and worked in the United Kingdom, the United States and France.

Independent since 2004, he had collaborated with the StarkNetwork in Paris before establishing his eponymous studio in Paris, France, in 2008, while also taking on the role of art director for the London-based, pan-African television channel , where he was responsible for the visual and broadcasting identity of the media.

In 2008, his Useless Tool, a chair manufactured using military aircraft technology, made international design headlines during the Please Do Not Sit exhibition in Paris.

In 2009, his self-produced Sparkling Joke coffee table, designed using recycled polyethylene terephthalate (PET) bottles and caps, caught the eye of Coca-Cola. He began a collaboration with them, leading to the creation of the Coca Cola Sustainable Design Awards trophy and a set of furniture made with the US beverages company and of recycled materials.

In 2010, Aguessy was featured with several of his works, including his emblematic Useless Chair, the Soissons porcelain floor lamp, and the 3some vase, by the Museum of Arts and Design in New York City in the Global Africa Project, an exhibition co-curated by Lowery Stokes Sims, MAD's Charles Bronfman International Curator, and Leslie King-Hammond. His work has been part of the MAD Museum's permanent collection since 2011.

Aguessy's research in new manufacturing technologies and sustainable energy sources led him to the establishment of the first Fab Lab (FabricationLaboratory), organized by the French Industrial Prospective and the Centre Pompidou, in Porto Novo, Benin, in February 2012.
 
That same year, he designed and manufactured Koss, the official 2012 present for the presidency of the United Nations Security Council, and conceived The Guardian, the monument celebrating the 50th anniversary of Togolese independence, while the Beaubourg Museum's Multiversités Créatives exhibition showcased the designer's first Benin Designed pieces.

In 2013 The KossiAguessy Studio moved from Paris to London and New York.

Aguessy's works have been in the permanent collection of the Beaubourg museum collection since 2013. As such, he became the first African-descent designer having a nominative section in the French contemporary arts and design museum.

Aguessy died on April 17, 2017.

Awards and exhibitions 

 Biographiques, Paris, 2003
 Biographiques, Art Shanghaï SAF, Shanghai, China, 2004/2005
 France 5 Exhibition, Paris, France, 2005
 Performance, ArtParis, France, 2006
 Fifi Design Awards 2007, Best 20 Perfume design, 2007
 Please Do Not Sit, Tools Gal, Paris, 2008
 WallPapper UK 10 best Design Awards, 2010
 Sustainable Design Award, 2010
 Freeze Art London, UK, 2010
 G.A.P, Museum of Arts and Design MAD, New York USA, 2010–2011
 Permanent Collection, MoMA ps1, 2011
 Conversation(s), Bensimon Gal, Paris, 2011
 Permanent Collection, Museum of Arts and Design MAD, New-York USA, 2011
 Multiversités Créatives, Musée George Pompidou/ Beaubourg, Paris, France, 2012
 Magic, Bensimon Gal, Paris, 2012
 BrancoNegro, Artcurial, Paris, 2012
 Permanent Collection, Musée George Pompidou/ Beaubourg, Paris, France, 2013
 Making Africa - A Continent of Contemporary Design, Vitra Design Museum, Germany, 2015
 OCTOBRE ORANGE, Vallois Gallery, Paris, 2015

References and notes 
 Centre Georges Pompidou ressources [archive]
 MAD Museum resources

References

External links 
 www.kossiaguessy.biz
 www.aguessy.life
 Ultimate design is not a concept but life on Yatzer.com
 Kossi Aguessy on Multiversités créatives
 Jeune Afrique Kossi Aguessy
 Egodesign on Kossi Aguessy
 Kossi Aguessy on French Ministry of Culture

1977 births
2017 deaths
Togolese artists
People from Lomé
Alumni of Central Saint Martins
21st-century Togolese people